Miscera eubrachycera is a moth in the family Brachodidae. It was described by Alexey Diakonoff in 1968. It is found in the Philippines.

References

Natural History Museum Lepidoptera generic names catalog

Brachodidae
Moths described in 1968